The Stafford Brothers is an Australian reality series screened on Fox8. The series follows the lives of Chris and Matt Stafford of Stafford Brothers, a dance music duo taking on the European scene.

History

The series was developed by WD Entertainment Group and began broadcast on Fox8 Australia in 2009.

The first season of The Stafford Brothers premiered on 21 January 2011 and consists of 6 episodes.. Season 1 was based around the premise of "What happens on Tour, No Longer Stays on Tour" as the series followed the real life of Matt and Chris Stafford as they toured and performed around Europe. The series shot at locations including Ibiza, Mykonos, Santorini, Belfast, Majorca and London.

The second series premiered 27 January 2012.

Series two is ten brand new episodes that follows several new story-lines including the production of new Stafford Brothers music, including Pressure, along with auditioning across Australia for new vocalists for their upcoming tracks. Nightclub manager Joey, who was featured heavily in the series, went through rehab in Thailand (filmed at Atmanjai), and followed his progress managing two Gold Coast nightclubs Platinum and Love, both venues are part owned by the Stafford Brothers.

Series 1 and Series 2 is currently playing around the world, including Canada, Brazil, Finland, The Netherlands, Belgium and across Sony's AXN Network throughout Central Europe.

Series 3 is currently in development with WD Entertainment Group and 3SizZero Productions.

See also
Freshwater Blue
Being Lara Bingle

References

External links 
 
 Show's website
 
 TV Tonight: The Stafford Brothers
 Coast DJs want to keep up with the Kardashians
 inthemix

Fox8 original programming
2011 Australian television series debuts
2010s Australian reality television series
English-language television shows
Television shows set in Gold Coast, Queensland